Edgar Lyons was an American cinematographer, his first credit was the silent film Montana Bill in 1921.

Filmography

All as cinematographer, unless otherwise noted, as Per AFI database.

Montana Bill (1921)
Smiling Jim (1922)
A Western Demon (1922)
The Firebrand (1922)
The Torrent (1924)
Soiled (1924) Additional photography
The Virgin (1924)
Do It Now (1924)
The Reckless Sex (1925) Additional photography
Three Wise Goofs (1925) (short)
Hold Tight (1925) (short)
Danger Ahead (1926) (short)
The Fighting Trooper (1934)
The Singing Vagabond (1935)
Wilderness Mail (1935)
The Code of the Mounted (1935)
Racing Luck (1935)
Northern Frontier (1935)
The Big Show (1936)
The Singing Cowboy (1936)
Go-Get-'Em-Haines (1936)
The Old Corral (1936)
Death Valley Outlaws (1941)
Shadows on the Sage (1942)
Stagecoach to Denver (1946)
The El Paso Kid (1946)

References

1894 births
1950 deaths
American cinematographers